The New Lost City Ramblers, or NLCR, was an American contemporary old-time string band that formed in New York City in 1958 during the folk revival. Mike Seeger, John Cohen and Tom Paley were its founding members. Tracy Schwarz replaced Paley, who left the group in 1962. Seeger died of cancer in 2009, Paley died in 2017, and Cohen died in 2019. NLCR participated in the old-time music revival, and directly influenced many later musicians.

Career
The Ramblers distinguished themselves by focusing on the traditional playing styles they heard on old 78rpm records of musicians recorded during the 1920s and 1930s, many of whom had earlier appeared on the Anthology of American Folk Music. The New Lost City Ramblers refused to "sanitize" these southern sounds as did other folk groups of the time, such as the Weavers or Kingston Trio. Instead, the Ramblers have always strived for an authentic sound. However, the Ramblers did not merely copy the old recordings that inspired them. Rather, they would use the various old-time styles they encountered while at the same time not becoming slaves to imitation.

The Ramblers named themselves in response to a request by  Moe Asch, based on 
an amalgam of a favorite tune, J. E. Mainer's "New Lost Train Blues"; a favorite group,  Charlie Poole and the North Carolina Ramblers; and a reference to the urban settings in which they played old-timey music.

On Songs from the Depression, the New Lost City Ramblers performed a variety of popular political songs from the New Deal days, all but one of them taken from commercially issued 78s, and that one is "Keep Moving", identified in the album notes only as "from Tony Schwartz's collection — singer unidentified"  when actually it is by Agnes "Sis" Cunningham, the full title being "How Can You Keep On Moving (Unless You Migrate Too)". The omission later caused Ry Cooder, who listened to the Ramblers album, to record the song as Traditional on the first edition of his Into the Purple Valley album, an omission he gladly corrected when informed of it. Cooder also covered another song from the same New Lost City Ramblers album, which he may have heard on a poorly labeled cassette copy: "Taxes on the Farmer Feeds Us All" which the New Lost City Ramblers credit to Fiddling John Carson but which the Cooder notes still list as "traditional". The same is true of the track "Boomer's Story", covered by the Ramblers—Cooder credits it as "traditional", but the song was written by Carson Robison and first recorded by him in 1929 under the title "The Railroad Boomer".

In his autobiography, Chronicles: Volume One, Bob Dylan described the impression the Ramblers made on him when he heard their records in 1960:

The group drifted apart during the latter half of the 1960s. Schwarz and Seeger performed with different musicians and together formed the short lived Strange Creek Singers.

The New Lost City Ramblers' extensive recordings for the Folkways label became, after the death of Moe Asch, part of the Smithsonian Institution, which reissues Folkways titles on CD.

John Cohen is said to have inspired the titular John of the Grateful Dead's 1970 song "Uncle John's Band".

Discography 
 The New Lost City Ramblers (1958) (Folkways Records)
 Songs from the Depression (1959) (Folkways)
 Old-Timey Songs For Children (1959) (Folkways)
 The New Lost City Ramblers Vol. II (1960) (Folkways)
 The New Lost City Ramblers Vol. III (1961) (Folkways)
 Tom Paley, John Cohen, Mike Seeger Sing Songs of The New Lost City Ramblers (1961)
 The New Lost City Ramblers (1961)
 Earth Is Earth Sung by The New Lost City Bang Boys (1961) (Folkways)
 The New Lost City Ramblers Vol. 4 (1962) (Folkways)
 American Moonshine & Prohibition (1962) (Folkways)
 The New Lost City Ramblers Vol. 5 (1963) (Folkways)
 Gone to the Country (1963)
 Radio Special # 1 (1963)
 The New New Lost City Ramblers with Tracy Schwarz: Gone to the Country (1963) (Folkways)
 String Band Instrumentals (1964) (Folkways)
 Old Timey Music (1964)
 Rural Delivery No. 1 (1965) (Folkways)
 Remembrance of Things to Come (1966) (Folkways)
 Modern Times (1968) (Folkways)
 The New Lost City Ramblers with Cousin Emmy (1968) (Folkways)
 On the Great Divide (1975) (Folkways)
 20th Anniversary Concert (1978)
 20 Years-Concert Performances (1978)
 Tom Paley, John Cohen, and Mike Seeger Sing Songs of the New Lost City Ramblers (1978) (Folkways)
 Old Time Music (1994)
 The Early Years, 1958-1962 (1991) (Folkways)
 Out Standing In Their Field-Vol. II, 1963-1973 (1993) (Smithsonian Folkways)
 There Ain't No Way Out (1997) (Folkways)
 40 Years of Concert Performances (2001)
 50 Years: Where Do You Come From? Where Do You Go? (2009) (Smithsonian Folkways)

References

External links
 Illustrated New Lost City Ramblers discography
 Illustrated Tom Paley discography
 Discography at Smithsonian Folkways Recordings
 Interview with John Cohen & Tom Paley - 50th year of NLCR
new (2009) documentary film about the New Lost City Ramblers, with Mike Seeger, John Cohen, Tom Paley, Tracy Schwarz and many others (link broken)
 NPR Radio Piece about 50th Anniversary of the New Lost City Ramblers
 Oldtone Roots Music Festival Tribute Video by Fred Robbins
 New Lost City Ramblers at Davidson College Photos, May 1968 by Fred Robbins
 New Lost City Ramblers, Towne Crier Cafe, Beekman, NY, Feb. 24, 1975 by Fred Robbins

Musical groups established in 1958
Musical groups disestablished in 2019
American folk musical groups
Old-time bands
Folkways Records artists
1958 establishments in New York City
2019 disestablishments in New York (state)
Musical groups from New York City